Shanghai Disneyland Hotel is one of two hotels located within Shanghai Disney Resort. The hotel is in the Art Nouveau style, with Disney theming. The hotel is located across Wishing Star Lake from Shanghai Disneyland Park.

Dining
The hotel includes multiple restaurants, including Lumiere’s Kitchen (based on Disney's Beauty and the Beast franchise), Ballet Café, Bacchus Lounge, and Aurora.

References

External links
Official Website

Hotels in Shanghai Disney Resort
Hotels established in 2016
Hotel buildings completed in 2016
2016 establishments in China